Ralph Pete Cleage (January 25, 1898 – October 28, 1977) was an American Negro league outfielder in the 1920s.

A native of Athens, Tennessee, Cleage played for the St. Louis Stars in 1924. In 23 recorded games, he posted 17 hits in 77 plate appearances. Cleage died in Knoxville, Tennessee in 1977 at age 79.

References

External links
 and Seamheads

1898 births
1977 deaths
St. Louis Stars (baseball) players
20th-century African-American sportspeople